Trade unions in the Marshall Islands. With a total population of 59,000 the Marshall Islands support a very small economy which does not have a trade union structure. The Constitution allows for the general right of association; however, there is no legislation related to trade unions, collective bargaining, or strike action.

References